Daniel John 'Danny' Bowes (born 14 April 1960, West Ham, Essex, England) is a British hard rock singer.

Education
Bowes was educated at Haberdashers' Aske's Hatcham College.

Life and career
Bowes is the lead singer with the rock act, Thunder. Previously, he was a member of Nuthin' Fancy and 1980s group Terraplane, both with Thunder guitarist Luke Morley who he also recorded with as duet 'Bowes & Morley'.In August 2022 Danny sustained an accidental head injury that required surgery. The operation went according to plan, and was moved out of intensive care, he is now responding well to further treatment

Bowes took to the road with another Thunder bandmate Ben Matthews for several concerts titled "An Evening With Danny & Ben From Thunder" in early 2012 and has contributed vocals to an album by Dean Howard who was previously with T'Pau. He also currently hosts a show on Planet Rock.

References

External links
Danny Bowes on Planet Rock

1960 births
Living people
English male singers
People from West Ham
English rock singers
Thunder (band) members